Skyler White is a fictional character from the television series Breaking Bad.

Skyler White may also refer to:

Skyler White (writer) (born 1967), American fantasy and science fiction, romance, and erotica novelist
Skyler White (basketball) (born 1993), player for George Washington Colonials and Idaho Vandals men's college basketball teams